The 2020–21 South Alabama Jaguars women's basketball team represented the University of South Alabama during the 2020–21 NCAA Division I women's basketball season. The basketball team, led by seventh-year head coach Terry Fowler, played all home games at the Mitchell Center along with the South Alabama Jaguars men's basketball team. They were members of the Sun Belt Conference.

Previous season 
The Jaguars finished the 2019–20 season 16–16, 9–9 in Sun Belt play to finish fifth place in the conference. They made it to the 2019-20 Sun Belt Conference women's basketball tournament where they defeated Arkansas State in the First Round and UT Arlington in the Quarterfinals. Following their victory, the remainder of the tournament as well as all postseason play was cancelled due to the COVID-19 pandemic.

Offseason

Departures

Recruiting

Roster

Schedule and results

|-
!colspan=9 style=| Non-conference Regular Season
|-

|-
!colspan=9 style=| Conference Regular Season
|-

|-
!colspan=9 style=| Sun Belt Tournament

See also
 2020–21 South Alabama Jaguars men's basketball team

References

South Alabama Jaguars women's basketball seasons
South Alabama Jaguars
South Alabama Jaguars women's basketball
South Alabama Jaguars women's basketball